Mir Mirab-e Olya (also Romanized as Mīr Mīrāb-e ‘Olyā; also known as Mīleh Mīrāb-e ‘Olyā) is a village in Vizhenan Rural District, in the Central District of Gilan-e Gharb County, Kermanshah Province, Iran. At the 2006 census, its population was 278, in 63 families.

References 

Populated places in Gilan-e Gharb County